West Side School District (or West Side Public Schools) is a public school district based in Greers Ferry, Arkansas, United States. It provides early childhood, elementary and secondary education for more than 500 prekindergarten through grade 12 students at its two facilities in Cleburne County. The district is accredited by the Arkansas Department of Education (ADE).

It also includes Prim and Edgemont.

In 2012, the high school was nationally recognized as a Bronze Medalist in the Best High Schools Report 2012 developed by U.S. News & World Report.

Schools 
 West Side High School, serving approximately 250 students in grades 7 through 12.
 West Side Elementary School, serving approximately 250 students in kindergarten through grade 6.

References

Further reading
 (Download) - Includes maps of predecessor districts
 (Download) - Includes maps of predecessor districts

External links 
 

School districts in Arkansas
Education in Cleburne County, Arkansas
Education in Van Buren County, Arkansas